Hypolycaena erylus, the common tit, is a small but striking butterfly found in India and South-East Asia that belongs to the lycaenids or blues family. The species was first described by Jean-Baptiste Godart in 1823.

Range
Bangladesh, Nepal, Sikkim, Myanmar, Cambodia, Thailand, Laos, Vietnam, southern Yunnan, Java, Lombok, Peninsular Malaysia, Sumatra, Borneo, Andamans, Nias, Sulawesi, Philippines, Sula, Bachan, Halmahera, Obi, Bismarck Archipelago and Waigeu.

Status
Common. Not rare as per Haribal.

Description
The underside of both sexes is pale greyish brown. The underside hindwing does not have a spot in the basal area of 7. The butterfly has two tails – a 6 mm long one at V1 and a 5 mm long tail at V2. The markings include:
 a double bar at end-cell
 a regular discal line on the forewing
 a broken, less regular line on the hindwing

The male butterfly is pale blue to dark brown above, dark shining purple depending on the light. It has a black border with the upper forewing having a large black discal area of modified scales.

The female butterfly is dark brown and its hindwing has a white disconnected discal band above the tornus. The butterfly also has a white-edged tornal black spot in 2.

Subspecies
The butterfly has a number of subspecies of which one, H. e. himavantus (Fruhstorfer), is found in mainland India while another H. e. andamana Moore is found in the Andamans. All subspecies are:
H. e. erylus (Java)
H. e. pupienus Fruhstorfer, 1912 (Lombok)
H. e. teatus Fruhstorfer, 1912 (southern Thailand, Peninsular Malaya, Sumatra, Borneo)
H. e. himavantus Fruhstorfer, 1912 (Nepal, Sikkim to Myanmar, Thailand, Laos, Vietnam, southern Yunnan)
H. e. andamana Moore, 1877 (Andamans)
H. e. syphax Fruhstorfer, 1912 (Nias)
H. e. gamatius Fruhstorfer, 1912 (Sulawesi) (= H. e. pigres Fruhstorfer, 1912 (Obi))
H. e. tmolus C. Felder & R. Felder, 1862 (Philippines)
H. e. orsiphantus Fruhstorfer, 1912 (Philippines: Basilan)
H. e. aimnestus Fruhstorfer, 1912 (Palawan)
H. e. georgius Fruhstorfer, 1912 (Sula)
H. e. thyrius Fruhstorfer, 1912 (Bachan, Halmahera)
H. e. moutoni Ribbe
H. e. figulus Fruhstorfer, 1912 (Waigeu)
H. e. erna Kalis, 1933 (Bismarck Archipelago)

Habits
The butterfly is abundant at low elevations. Males are known to cluster at damp patches while the females are rarely seen.

Food plants
Recorded on Meyna pubescens in India.

Gallery

See also
List of butterflies of India
List of butterflies of India (Lycaenidae)

Cited references

References
 
 
 
 

Butterflies of Asia
Hypolycaenini
Butterflies of Singapore
Butterflies of Borneo